Ridge is an English surname. Additionally, as an Anglo-Irish surname, Ridge may translate Mac an Iomaire or Mac Con Iomaire.

Notable people with the surname include:

 Alan Ridge (born 1934), Australian politician
 Albert Alphonso Ridge (1898–1967), American judge
 Antonia Ridge (1895–1981), Dutch-British writer and broadcaster
 Ben Ridge (born 1989), Australian rugby league footballer
 John Ridge or Yellow Bird (1802–1839), member of the Cherokee Tribe, son of Major Ridge
 John Rollin Ridge or Cheesquatalawny (1827–1867), member of the Cherokee tribe, first Native American novelist
 Major Ridge or Pathkiller II (1771–1839), Cherokee Indian leader
 Matthew Ridge (born 1968), New Zealand rugby footballer
 Sophy Ridge (born 1984), English journalist
 Sterling Ridge (1936–2012), American politician
 Stuart Ridge (born 1961), English cricketer
 Tom Ridge (born 1945), American politician and author

English-language surnames